John T. Hughes may refer to:

 John T. Hughes (Confederate officer) (1817–1862), colonel in the Missouri State Guard and Confederate Army
 John T. Hughes (politician) (1873–1921), American politician from Arizona, member of the 1st Arizona state legislature
 John T. Hughes (intelligence officer), U.S. Defense Intelligence Agency officer